Helicase, POLQ-like, also known as helicase Q, hel308 and Holliday junction migration protein, encoded by the gene HELQ1, is a DNA helicase found in humans, archea and many other organisms.

Gene 

The gene encoding this enzyme, HELQ1, is located on chromosome 4q21 in humans. It is associated with the polymerase pathway.

Nomenclature 

When first reported, Helicase Q was called "Holliday junction migration protein."  

Like many proteins, Hel308 was named after a previously discovered protein to which it had some connection.  In this case, the "Hel" stands for "human helicase" and the "308" is a reference to the Drosophila melanogaster protein Mus308, to which it is homologous.

Classification 

Hel308 is part of DNA helicase superfamily II, a group of enzymes that wind and unwind DNA.  Hel308 is found throughout archea and in some eukaryotes, including humans. It contains twenty exons.

Structure and function 

Helicase Q's principal role is in the DNA repair. Helicase Q was shown to play a role in the repair of DNA double-strand breaks and to prevent tandem duplications. Organisms with mutations in the gene encoding helicase Q are sensitive to replication-blocking lesions, such as interstrand DNA cross-links that interfere with the forking of DNA during replication.

Hel308 is a large protein, 1101 amino acids in length, with five separate domains.  The third and fourth domains form a large central pore that holds single-stranded DNA.  Its fifth domain acts as a brake by securing the single-strand DNA protruding through this pore.

Clinical significance 

Mutations in HEL308 are associated with cancer of the pharynx and mouth.

See also 
 Helicase
 DNA repair
 DNA replication

References 

Human proteins
DNA
DNA repair
DNA replication